Cutupú is a small town in the northern part of La Vega Province in the Dominican Republic.

Populated places in La Vega Province